Hilltop Baptist School was a private Christian school located in Colorado Springs, Colorado, United States. The school was a ministry of Hilltop Baptist Church and belonged to the Southern Baptist Association of Christian Schools (SBACS).

History
The school was founded in 1979.

Enrollment at Hilltop Baptist School fell after a teacher sexually abused a student and administrators, some related to the teacher, did not report the assault to the state and fired a teacher and a coach who did. The school subsequently closed. In its final year of operation, 2010–11, it had 43 students.

References

Christian schools in Colorado
Baptist schools in the United States
1979 establishments in Colorado
2011 disestablishments in Colorado
Educational institutions established in 1979
Educational institutions disestablished in 2011
Defunct Christian schools in the United States
Defunct schools in Colorado